Benimakia sowerbyi is a species of sea snail, a marine gastropod mollusc in the family Fasciolariidae, the spindle snails, the tulip snails and their allies.

Description

Distribution

References

 Bouchet P. & Snyder M.A. (2013) New and old species of Benimakia (Neogastropoda: Fasciolariidae) and a description of Nodolatirus, new genus. Journal of Conchology 41(3): 331-341.

Fasciolariidae
Gastropods described in 1907